Andreas Charitou (born 29 December 1961) is a Cypriot retired football goalkeeper who played the majority of his career for Omonia Nicosia.

International career
Charitou made his debut for Cyprus in a September 1984 friendly match against Greece and earned a total of 15 caps, scoring no goals. His final international was a November 1991 Euro Championship qualifier against the Soviet Union.

De Kuip bomb incident
In a Euro 1988 qualifier on 28 October 1987, in Rotterdam, a homemade bomb made of fireworks in a tennisball exploded close to Charitou in the early stages of the game. He was subsequently stretchered off and replaced, and the Cypriot players left the field in protest and refused to continue playing.

After much pressure from the Dutch team, Luxembourg referee Roger Philippi decided the game could continue. The match ended 8–0 with John Bosman establishing a Dutch national-team record of five goals in one game, but UEFA decided that the match was invalid and Cyprus were awarded a 0–3 victory instead, giving Greece the opportunity to qualify; the Dutch successfully appealed, with Dr. Greep stating that Charitou was not actually injured, which resulted in a replay in Amsterdam. Holland duly qualified and won the 1988 Euro Championships.

Honours

Club
 AC Omonia
 Cypriot Championship (7): 1981–82, 1982–83, 1983–84, 1984–85, 1986–87, 1988–89, 1992–93
 Cypriot Cup (5): 1981–82, 1982–83, 1987–88, 1990–91, 1993–94
Stylianakis Shield (7): 1981, 1982, 1983, 1987, 1988, 1989, 1991

Individual
 CFA Moral Footballer of the Year (1): 1987
 1998 Fair Play Ambassador of Cyprus Sports Organization

References

External links
 

1961 births
Living people
Association football goalkeepers
Cypriot footballers
Cyprus international footballers
Cypriot First Division players
Cypriot Second Division players
AC Omonia players